38 Virginis is an F-type main sequence star in the constellation of Virgo.  It is around 108 light years distant from the Earth.

Nomenclature
The name 38 Virginis derives from the star being the 38th star in order of right ascension catalogued in the constellation Virgo by Flamsteed in his star catalogue. The designation b of 38 Virginis b derives from the order of discovery and is given to the first planet orbiting a given star, followed by the other lowercase letters of the alphabet. In the case of 38 Virginis, only one was discovered, which was designated b.

Stellar characteristics
38 Virginis is an F-type main sequence star that is approximately 118% the mass of and 145% the radius of the Sun. It has a temperature of 6557 K and is about 1.9 billion years old. In comparison, the Sun is about 4.6 billion years old and has a temperature of 5778 K.

The star is metal-rich, with a metallicity ([Fe/H]) of 0.07 dex, or 117% the solar amount. Its luminosity is 3.48 times that of the Sun.

A companion star is cataloged in the CCDM at a separation of half an arcsecond.

Planetary system

The star is known to host one exoplanet, 38 Virginis b, discovered in 2016. This planet has a relatively low eccentricity out of any long-period giant exoplanet discovered, with an eccentricity of 0.03. The planet has a mass of around 4.5 times that of the planet Jupiter. Its orbit very likely puts it and any moons it may have in the habitable zone of its star.

Notes

References

F-type main-sequence stars
Planetary systems with one confirmed planet
Virgo (constellation)
Double stars
Durchmusterung objects
Virginis, 38
111998
062875
4891